The 1st Warsaw Armoured Brigade (Polish: 1 Warszawska Brygada Pancerna) is a brigade of the Polish Armed Forces, based in Warsaw.

History
Polish 1st Armoured Brigade "defenders of Westerplatte" or Polish 1st Warsaw Armoured Brigade (Polish: 1 Warszawska Brygada Pancerna) was a military unit in the Ludowe Wojsko Polskie. It was formed on August 19, 1943, from a regiment (pułk) of the same name.

The unit fought at the Battle of Lenino (September 1943) and at the Battle of Studzianki during the Lublin-Brest Offensive (Magnuszew bridgeheads in August 1944). From mid-August it was subordinate to the Polish First Army. Later the unit fought in the East Pomeranian Offensive.

In January 1945 it received another honorary name, Warszawska (of Warsaw). In July and August 1945 fought against Polish anti-Communist guerrilla. In January 1946 it was downsized to regiment (becoming 1st Warsaw Tank Regiment), and from June it was stationed in the Modlin area.

The modern version of the 1st Warsaw Armoured Brigade was formed in 1994 and was subordinated to the 16th Pomeranian Mechanised Division. On August 29, 2019, the brigade was transferred under the command of the newly formed 18th "Żelazna" Mechanised Division, which is intended to help safeguard Poland's eastern border.

Structure

 The 1st Warsaw Armoured Brigade "Tadeusz Kościuszko" is headquartered in Wesoła and structured as follows:
 Command Battalion in Wesoła
 Tank Battalion in Wesoła with Leopard 2A5 main battle tanks
 1st Mechanised Battalion in Chełm with BWP-1 infantry fighting vehicles
 3rd Mechanised Battalion in Zamość with BWP-1 infantry fighting vehicles
 Self-propelled Artillery Group in Chełm with 2S1 Gvozdika 122mm self-propelled howitzers
 Anti-aircraft Group in Siedlce with ZUR-23-2 kg "Jodek-G" anti-aircraft systems and Grom surface-to-air missiles
 Reconnaissance Company in Siedlce with BRDM-2 vehicles
 Engineer Company in Siedlce
 Logistic Battalion in Wesoła

Popular culture
The Polish TV series Czterej pancerni i pies (Four tank men and a dog)  featured the adventures of a tank crew from this brigade.

References

External link

Armoured brigades of Poland
Military units and formations established in 1943
Military units and formations of Poland in World War II